The Coupe de France's results of the 1959–60 season. AS Monaco FC won the final played on 15 May 1960, beating AS Saint-Étienne.

Round of 16

Quarter-finals

Semi-finals

Final

References

French federation

1959–60 domestic association football cups
Coupe
1959-60